Tanja Niskanen (born 11 September 1992) is a Finnish ice hockey player and former member of the Finnish national team, currently playing in the Naisten Liiga with KalPa Naiset. Following her second Olympic bronze medal win in February 2022, she announced her retirement from the national team and, in March 2022, confirmed her intention to step away from elite-level club competition following the 2022 Aurora Borealis Cup playoffs.

Playing career 
Niskanen first joined the senior Finnish national team in 2009 and made her major tournament debut at the 2011 IIHF Women's World Championship. Representing Finland, she won bronze medals in the women’s ice hockey tournaments at the 2018 Winter Olympics in Pyeongchang and 2022 Winter Olympics in Beijing. She won a silver medal at the IIHF Women's World Championship in 2019, won bronze medals at the tournaments in 2011, 2017 and 2021, and participated in the 2016 IIHF Women's World Championship.

As a junior player with the Finnish national under-18 ice hockey team, Niskanen participated in the IIHF Women's U18 World Championships in 2008, 2009, and 2010.

References

External links
 
 
 

1992 births
Living people
People from Juankoski
Finnish women's ice hockey forwards
KalPa Naiset players
JYP Jyväskylä Naiset players
Ice hockey players at the 2018 Winter Olympics
Ice hockey players at the 2022 Winter Olympics
Medalists at the 2018 Winter Olympics
Medalists at the 2022 Winter Olympics
Olympic bronze medalists for Finland
Olympic ice hockey players of Finland
Olympic medalists in ice hockey
Sportspeople from North Savo